The Guatemalan Athletics Federation  (FNA; Federación  Nacional de Atletismo de Guatemala) is the governing body for the sport of athletics in Guatemala.  Current president is Max Leonel Mollinedo Ticas (2018-2022).

History 
FNA was founded in 1945.

Affiliations 
FNA is the national member federation for Guatemala in the following international organisations:
International Association of Athletics Federations (IAAF)
North American, Central American and Caribbean Athletic Association (NACAC)
Association of Panamerican Athletics (APA)
Asociación Iberoamericana de Atletismo (AIA; Ibero-American Athletics Association)
Central American and Caribbean Athletic Confederation (CACAC)
Confederación Atlética del Istmo Centroamericano (CADICA; Central American Isthmus Athletic Confederation)
Moreover, it is part of the following national organisations:
Guatemalan Olympic Committee (COG; Spanish: Comité Olímpico Guatemalteco)

Members 

FNA comprises the departmental associations of Guatemala.

National records 
FNA maintains the Guatemalan records in athletics.

References

External links 
Official Webpage (in Spanish)

Guatemala
Sports governing bodies in Guatemala
Athletics in Guatemala
National governing bodies for athletics
Sports organizations established in 1945